Germer is a surname of German origin. Notable people with the surname include:

 Adolph Germer (1881–1964), American political functionary and union organizer
 Amos E. Germer (1862–1935), American politician
 Edmund Germer (1901–1987), German inventor
 Karl Germer (1885–1962), German occultist
 Lester Germer (1896–1971), American physicist
 Peter Germer (born 1949), German former wrestler
 Saint Geremarus (died 658), Frankish monk and abbot

References

Surnames of German origin